Andy Nelson's Barbecue is a BBQ restaurant in Cockeysville, Maryland. Founded by former Baltimore Colts safety and Super Bowl winner Andy Nelson, it is known for its hickory smoked BBQ. The restaurant regularly wins "Baltimore's Best BBQ" by Baltimore Magazine and the City Paper.

See also
 List of barbecue restaurants

References

Sources
Official Site
Article about eatery
Award
Award
Review
Review

Cockeysville, Maryland
Restaurants in Baltimore
Barbecue restaurants in the United States
Theme restaurants